6α-Methyl-17α-bromoprogesterone is a steroidal progestin related to haloprogesterone (6α-fluoro-17α-bromoprogesterone) that was described in 1963 and was never marketed.

See also
 17α-Bromoprogesterone

References

Abandoned drugs
Bromoarenes
Diketones
Pregnanes
Progestogens